Lê Nguyễn Bảo Ngọc (born June 18, 2001) is a Vietnamese beauty queen and model. She was crowned Miss Intercontinental 2022 in Egypt on October 14, 2022. Before that, she was placed 1st Runner-up at Miss World Vietnam 2022 and Top 22 at Miss Vietnam 2020.

Early life and education 
Le Nguyen Bao Ngoc was born on June 18, 2001 in Cần Thơ. Currently, she is a student of the Faculty of Business Administration at Ho Chi Minh City International University, she also achieved IELTS 8.0.

Pageantry

Miss Vietnam 2020 
Bao Ngoc registered to attend Miss Vietnam 2020 and this was the first beauty contest she attended. On the final night she made it to the Top 22 finalists of the competition.

Miss World Vietnam 2022 
In 2022, she returned to the beauty race by enrolling in the contest Miss World Vietnam 2022. On the semi-final night, she entered the Top 20 finalists with the award Miss Fashion.

At the final night of the contest, after the evening gown competition, she continued to win the sub-prize Beauty with a Purpose and entered the Top 5, then she placed 1st runner-up.

Miss Intercontinental 2022 
As 1st runner-up at Miss World Vietnam 2022, she was entitled to attend Miss Intercontinental 2022 held on October 14, 2022 in Egypt.

At the final night of the contest, she was excellently crowned Miss Intercontinental 2022 with the special award Miss Intercontinental Asia & Ocenia.

References

2001 births
Living people
Vietnamese beauty pageant winners